The Floyd-Newsome House is a historic house in Phenix City, Alabama, U.S.. It was built in 1898 as a cottage for Dr Floyd, a physician and judge who was also the mayor of Phenix City. By 1908, a second story was built, and it was redesigned in the classical architectural style. It remained in the Floyd family until 1958, when it was purchased by the Aldridge family. It has been listed on the National Register of Historic Places since November 3, 1983.

References

Houses on the National Register of Historic Places in Alabama
Victorian architecture in Alabama
Neoclassical architecture in Alabama
Houses completed in 1898
Houses in Russell County, Alabama